is a Japanese actor and voice actor from Osaka Prefecture. He is affiliated with Production Taiku.

Filmography

Television animation
Parappa the Rapper (2001) (The Prince (human))
Kyo Kara Maoh! (2004) (Monk)
Madlax (2004) (SSS)
Blood+ (2005) (Veteran)
Cluster Edge (2005) (General)
Full Metal Panic!: The Second Raid (2005) (Middle-aged doctor)
Speed Grapher (2005) (Professor)
Super Robot Wars Original Generation: Divine Wars (2006) (Captain)
Romeo × Juliet (2007) (Titus)
Naruto: Shippuden (2009) (Gerotora)
Highschool of the Dead (2010) (Tadashi Miyamoto (episode 2))
Dance in the Vampire Bund (2010) (Katsuichi Mizoguchi)
Francesca: Girls Be Ambitious (2014) (Dr. W.S. Clark)
Punch Line (2015) (Qmay Tsubouchi)
Blue Exorcist: Kyoto Saga (2017) (Tatsuma Suguro)
FLCL Progressive (2018) (Tonkichi)
Vinland Saga (2019) (Ragnar)
Godzilla Singular Point (2021) (Tsunetomo Yamamoto)
Summer Time Rendering (2022) (Ginjirō Nezu)
Spy × Family (2022) (Murdoch Swan)

OVA
Saikano Another Love Story (2005) (Deputy secretary)
Armored Trooper VOTOMS: Case; Irvine (2011) (Clemenceau)
Mobile Suit Gundam: The Origin (2015) (Degwin Sodo Zabi)
Kaitō Queen wa Circus ga Osuki (2022) (Inspector Kamikoshi)

ONA
Kengan Ashura (2019) (Ken Ooya)

Theatrical animation
Crayon Shin-chan: Fierceness That Invites Storm! Operation Golden Spy (2011) (Butter)
Detective Conan: Dimensional Sniper (2014) (Commentator)
Crayon Shin-chan: Mononoke Ninja Chinpūden (2022) (Elder)

Video games
Soulcalibur IV (2008) (Cervantes de León)
Soulcalibur V (2012) (Cervantes de León)
Final Fantasy XV (2016) (Verstael Besithia)
Sekiro: Shadows Die Twice (2019) (Sculptor)
Kingdom Hearts III (2019) (Narrator from Olympus)
Resident Evil 3 (2020) (Dr. Nathaniel Bard)

Dubbing roles

Live-action
Anthony Hopkins
Thor (Odin)
Thor: The Dark World (Odin)
Noah (Methuselah)
Solace (John Clancy)
American Gods (Mr. Wednesday (Ian McShane))
Anne with an E (Matthew Cuthbert (R. H. Thomson))
Bad Asses (Bernie Pope (Danny Glover))
Blade Runner: The Final Cut (Bryant (M. Emmet Walsh))
Captain America: The First Avenger (Tower Keeper (David Bradley))
Contagion (Rear Admiral Lyle Haggerty (Bryan Cranston))
The Death and Life of Bobby Z (Johnson (Keith Carradine))
Doubt (Father Brendan Flynn (Philip Seymour Hoffman))
Dumbo (Maximilian "Max" Medici (Danny DeVito))
Dune (Thufir Hawat (Stephen McKinley Henderson))
Fast Five (Chief of Police Alemeida)
Footloose (Uncle Wes Warnicker (Ray McKinnon))
From Dusk till Dawn: The Series (Jacob Fuller (Robert Patrick))
Game of Thrones (Robert Baratheon (Mark Addy))
The Games Maker (Nicholas (Ed Asner))
Ghostbusters: Afterlife (Hardware Store Owner (Tracy Letts))
The Girl with the Dragon Tattoo (Dirch Frode (Steven Berkoff))
The Golden Child (On-demand edition) (Old Goupa (Victor Wong))
The Good Liar (Bryn (Mark Lewis Jones))
Gossip Girl (Cyrus Rose (Wallace Shawn))
Grace and Frankie (Robert Hanson (Martin Sheen))
Harry Potter and the Deathly Hallows – Part 2 (Argus Filch (David Bradley))
Jumanji: The Next Level (Eddie Gilpin (Danny DeVito))
Layer Cake (Jimmy Price (Kenneth Cranham))
Little House on the Prairie (2019 NHK BS4K edition) (Rev. Robert Alden (Dabbs Greer))
Medium (District Attorney Manuel Devalos (Miguel Sandoval))
Mortal Engines (Mr. Wreyland (Peter Rowley))
Night at the Museum: Secret of the Tomb (Gus (Mickey Rooney))
North Face (2020 BS Tokyo edition) (Hans Schlunegger (Hanspeter Müller))
The O.C. (Caleb Nichol (Alan Dale))
One Day (Steven (Ken Stott))
One Tree Hill (Whitey Durham (Barry Corbin))
Paddington 2 (Judge Gerald Biggleswade (Tom Conti))
Pirates of the Caribbean: On Stranger Tides (Spanish Sea Captain (Juan Carlos Vellido))
Pixels (Admiral Porter (Brian Cox))
Point Break (Angelo Pappas (Ray Winstone))
Predator (2001 TV Asahi edition) (Blain Cooper (Jesse Ventura))
Project ALF (Gen. Myron Stone (John Schuck))
The Ridiculous 6 (Frank Stockburn (Nick Nolte))
Roman Holiday (2022 NTV edition) (Ambassador (Harcourt Williams))
Run All Night (Eddie Conlon (Nick Nolte))
Running Wild with Bear Grylls (Danny Trejo)
Salt (Oleg Vassily Orlov (Daniel Olbrychski))
Sarah's Key (Jules Dufaure (Niels Arestrup))
Somewhere in Time (2021 BS Tokyo edition) (Dr. Gerard Finney (George Voskovec))
St. Elmo's Fire (2022 The Cinema edition) (Mr. Beamish (Martin Balsam))
Taxi Driver (Wizard (Peter Boyle))
Today You Die (Bruno (Robert Miano))
Transformers: Dark of the Moon (Ratchet (Robert Foxworth))
Transformers: Age of Extinction (Ratchet)
Unfaithful (2006 TV Asahi edition) (Tracy (Kate Burton))
Unstoppable (Oscar Galvin (Kevin Dunn))
Whiplash (Jim Neiman (Paul Reiser))

Animation
The Adventures of Tintin (Thomson)
The Angry Birds Movie (Judge Peckinpah)
Arthur Christmas (Ernie Clicker)
Bee Movie (Layton T. Montgomery)
Cars (Doc Hudson)
Cars 3 (Doc Hudson)
Chip 'n Dale: Rescue Rangers (Captain Putty)
Inside Out (Anger)
Jackie Chan Adventures (Shendu, Ratso, Fox, policeman)
Lego Star Wars: Droid Tales (Emperor Palpatine)
Lego Star Wars: The Freemaker Adventures (Emperor Palpatine)
Lego Star Wars: The Yoda Chronicles (Emperor Palpatine)
Over the Garden Wall (The Woodsman)
The Queen's Corgi (Pollux)
Ratatouille (Skinner)
Spider-Man (Presiding judge)
Spider-Man and His Amazing Friends (Magneto, Mister Frump, Uncle Genju))
Star Wars: Clone Wars (K'Kruhk)
Teen Titans (Bob)
X-Men (Toon Disney edition) (Magneto)

References

External links
 

1956 births
Japanese male voice actors
Living people
Male voice actors from Osaka Prefecture